Qaleh Khvajeh (also Romanized as Qal‘eh Khvājeh and Qal‘eh-ye Khvājeh; also known as Ghal‘eh Khajeh) is a village in Yeylaq Rural District, in the Central District of Buin va Miandasht County, Isfahan Province, Iran. At the 2006 census, its population was 117, in 21 families.

References 

Populated places in Buin va Miandasht County